Henry Gage (1852–1924) was an American politician, the 20th governor of California.

Henry Gage is also the name of:
Henry Gage (soldier) (1597–1645), English 
Henry Gage, 3rd Viscount Gage (1761–1808), British soldier
Henry Gage, 4th Viscount Gage (1791–1877), British politician
Henry Gage, 5th Viscount Gage (1854–1912), British 
Henry Gage, 6th Viscount Gage (1895–1982), British politician
 Henry Gage (born 1934), a.k.a. Nicolas Gage, 8th Viscount Gage, British